The Barren Islands (Sugpiaq: Usu'unaat) are an archipelago in Alaska in the United States. They are the northernmost islands of the Kodiak Archipelago. The largest island of the group is Ushagat Island. The largest breeding grounds of seabirds in Alaska are located in the Barren Islands on East Amatuli Island and Nord Island. The archipelago is part of the Alaska Maritime National Wildlife Refuge.

Geography
The Barren Islands are a group of islands in the Gulf of Alaska that lie off the south-central coast of Alaska in the United States. They are the northernmost islands of the Kodiak Archipelago. They are located between the Kenai Peninsula on the Alaskan mainland to their northeast and Shuyak Island in the Kodiak Archipelago to their southwest.

The Barren Islands group is made up of six islands:

Prominent landmarks on the islands include:

 Table Mountain ( on the northeast end of Ushagat Island at

Government
The Barren Islands are uninhabited. Administratively, they are part of Alaska's Kodiak Island Borough. They also make up a part of the Gulf of Alaska Unit of the Alaska Maritime National Wildlife Refuge.

History

The Barren Islands were named on 25 May 1778 by the British explorer Captain James Cook of the Royal Navy, who wrote, "They obtained their name of Barren Isles from their very naked appearance."

References

Footnotes

Bibliography
 Orth, Donald J. Dictionary of Alaska Place Names. Washington, D.C.: United States Government Printing Office, 1967.
 Barren Islands: Block 2000, Census Tract 1, Kodiak Island Borough, Alaska (United States Census Bureau)

External links
 Barren Islands in the Geographic Names Information System of the United States Geological Survey

Islands of Alaska
Islands of the Kodiak Archipelago